Madhupran Wolfgang Schwerk is an ultra-marathon runner, born 28 July 1955 and now living in Solingen, Germany.  He was a trained retail-salesman, baritone opera singer, farmer, carpenter, and poultry breeder before becoming a house-husband in 1984.  He has been married to opera singer Cornelia Berger-Schwerk since 1981 and they have one daughter.

He is a highly respected multiday runner and was the 3100 mile World Record holder for nine years until Ashprihanal Aalto broke his record in 2015. Wolfgang also finished the Trans-Australia Race in 2001 (2,900 miles) and placed third in the Lisbon-Moscow race in 2003. In 2002 Schwerk impressed the running world with a tremendous victory in 42 days+13:24:03 (WR).This also established 74 new distance records, from 1400 miles up to 5000 km.

In the summer of 2006, he broke his own time of 42 days 13:24:03 set in 2002 with a new record of 41 days 08:16:29, averaging 75.111 miles per day.

From 1987 to 2006 Schwerk was also ranked second all time at the 24-hour distance with 171.628 miles.

References

External links
 Brief running biography

1956 births
Living people
German male long-distance runners
German ultramarathon runners
Male ultramarathon runners